Epic is a computer-moderated, fantasy play-by-mail (PBM) game.

Publication history
Epic was a computer-moderated, fantasy PBM game. Jim Landes designed the game and moderated it with his wife. Their company was Midnight Games. The game was published in 1985. Flagship editors compared the game to Quest of the Great Jewels, Tribes of Crane, and Earthwood. By 1988 the game was enjoying success in Australia, Great Britain, and the United States. By 1992 a new edition was introduced—Epic: The King's Game.

Gameplay
The Epic world comprised 22,000 provinces of varying types. Players could choose six character types: Arch-Priest, Merchant, Necromancer, Nomad, Warlord, and Wizard. Races were similar to those in Dungeons & Dragons, with additional races such as saurian, maratasen, and dak. Combat, diplomacy, and intrigue were elements of gameplay.

Reception
The editors of Flagship reviewed Epic in 1985, stating that it was "one of the year's more impressive new offerings, and worth a look if you fancy a fantasy wargame". A reviewer in a 1987 issue of Paper Mayhem gave the game a mixed review, noting its quantitative nature and detailed rulebook as a drawback for a fantasy game. John Woods reviewed Epic in a 1989 issue of The Games Machine, stating that it was "one of the best computer-moderated wargames on the market". 

In 1988, the game tied for 5th place in Paper Mayhem'''s Best PBM Game of 1988, along with Crack of Doom and Quest of the Great Jewels. In 1990, the game tied for 5th place again, with Supernova II, in Paper Mayhem's Best PBM Game of 1990. Robert J. Bunker reviewed Epic: The King's Game'' in 1992, stating it was "enjoyable, well thought-out and supported by one of the most reputable companies in PBM gaming".

See also
 List of play-by-mail games

Notes

References

Bibliography

Further reading

 
 
 

Play-by-mail games